Stanley Tucci is an American actor known for his roles in film and television and theatre.

He has been nominated for several prestigious awards including an Academy Award and British Academy Film Award nomination for his role in Peter Jackson's film The Lovely Bones. He has also received a Grammy Award nomination along with Meryl Streep for Best Spoken Word Album for Children for their joint performance in The One and Only Shrek (2008) as well as a Tony Award nomination for his performance in the Broadway revival of Frankie and Johnny in the Clair de Lune (2002). He also received 12 Primetime Emmy Award nominations receiving five wins for Winchell (1999), Monk (2007), Park Bench with Steve Buscemi (2016) and Stanley Tucci: Searching for Italy (2021 & 2022). He also received three Screen Actors Guild Awards nominations winning with the ensemble cast of Spotlight (2015) and three Golden Globe Awards winning for Winchell (1999), and Conspiracy'' (2001).

Major awards

Academy Awards

British Academy Film Awards

Golden Globe Awards

Grammy Awards

Primetime Emmy Awards

Screen Actors Guild Awards

Tony Awards

Industry awards

Gotham Awards

Independent Spirit Awards

Festival awards

Deauville Film Festival

Sundance Film Festival

Miscellaneous awards

Audie Awards

Satellite Awards

Saturn Awards

Film critic awards

References

Tucci, Stanley